Lieutenant General Virendra Vats, YSM, SM, VSM is a serving general officer of the Indian Army. He currently serves as the Commandant of the Defence Services Staff College, Wellington.

Early life and education
Vats attended the National Defence Academy, as part of the 73rd course. He then was part of the 83rd course of the Indian Military Academy.

Military career
Vats was commissioned into the 19th battalion, The Kumaon Regiment (19 Kumaon) in December 1988. Early in his career, he served as an instructor at the Infantry School. He subsequently attended the Defence Services Staff College, Wellington. After completing the course, he was appointed Brigade major of a mountain brigade.

In the rank of Colonel, Vats served as the Assistant Military Secretary in the MS branch. He then commanded his battalion, 19 Kumaon, in Operation Rhino in the North East. The battalion was awarded a unit citation by the Chief of the Army Staff, General Deepak Kapoor on Army Day 2008. For his command of 19 Kumaon, he was awarded the Sena Medal (distinguished) on 26 January 2008. 

After his command tenure, he moved to Army headquarters as the Director, Military Training. He subsequently attended the College of Defence Management in Secunderabad. After the course, he was appointed Defence attaché (DA) to the Commander-in-Chief, Andaman and Nicobar Command. He then served as the Director in the Military Operations directorate at Army HQ. For his tenure in the MO directorate, he was awarded the Vishisht Seva Medal as part of the Republic Day honours in 2014. 

Promoted to the rank of Brigadier, Vats commanded the 82 Mountain Brigade, deployed along the Line of actual control in eastern Arunachal Pradesh. The brigade also was part of Operation Rhino. As part of the United Nations, he served as a military observer in the Stabilization mission in the Congo. He subsequently commanded the North Kivu brigade, in the same mission. After his return to India, Vats was selected to attend the National Defence College in New Delhi, as part of the 57th course. He was subsequently appointed Brigadier General Staff (Concepts) at the headquarters of the Army Training Command (ARTRAC). He then moved to Army headquarters as the Brigadier Military Secretary (A) - his second tenure in the MS branch.

General officer
Vats was promoted to the rank of Major General and appointed General officer commanding 19 Infantry Division (Dagger Division) in Baramulla on the line of control in the Kashmir valley. For his tenure as GOC Dagger Division, he was awarded the Yudh Seva Medal on 26 January 2022. In late 2021, he moved to the Integrated Defence Staff headquarters as the Assistant Chief of Integrated Defence Staff (Training and Doctrine) (ACIDS Trg & Doc).

On 1 September 2022, Vats was promoted to the rank of Lieutenant General and appointed Commandant of the Defence Services Staff College.

Personal life
Vats is married to Namita Vats, a human resources professional. The couple has a son Aryan.

Awards and decorations
Vats was awarded the Sena Medal in 2008, the Vishisht Seva Medal in 2014, and the Yudh Seva Medal in 2022. He has also been awarded the Chief of the Army Staff's Commendation card and the Commander-in-Chief, Andaman and Nicobar Command Commendation Card.

References

Living people
Indian generals
Indian Army officers
Recipients of the Yudh Seva Medal
Recipients of the Sena Medal
Recipients of the Vishisht Seva Medal
National Defence Academy (India) alumni
Defence Services Staff College alumni
College of Defence Management alumni
National Defence College, India alumni
Commandants of Defence Services Staff College